Malika Booker (born 1970) is a British writer, poet and multi-disciplinary artist, who is considered "a pioneer of the present spoken word movement" in the UK. Her writing spans different genres of storytelling, including poetry, theatre, monologue, installation and education, and her work has appeared widely in journals and anthologies. Organizations for which she has worked include Arts Council England, the BBC, British Council, Wellcome Trust, National Theatre, Royal Shakespeare Company, Arvon, and Hampton Court Palace.

Biography
Malika Booker was born in London, UK, to Guyanese and Grenadian parents. She grew up in Guyana and returned to the UK aged 13, with her parents.

Booker began writing and performing poetry while studying anthropology at Goldsmiths, University of London. She founded the poetry collective Malika's Kitchen, which also included Nick Makoha. Her first collection of poetry, Pepper Seed, was published by Peepal Tree Press in 2013 and was shortlisted for the Seamus Heaney Centre prize for best first full collection published in the UK and Ireland. She was the inaugural Poet In Residence at the Royal Shakespeare Company.

Booker's poem "Nine Nights", first published in The Poetry Review in autumn 2016, was shortlisted for Best Single Poem in the 2017 Forward Prize.

She has written for radio and for the stage, and her work has appeared in journals and anthologies including Bittersweet: Contemporary Black Women’s Poetry (1998), The India International Journal (2005), Ten New Poets (2010), Out of Bounds, Black & Asian Poets (2012), and New Daughters of Africa (2019).

Awards
In 2019, Booker received a Cholmondeley Award for her outstanding contribution to poetry.

In 2020, Booker won the Forward Prize for Best Single Poem for "The Little Miracles", published in Magma.

Selected works 

 1998: Bittersweet: Contemporary Black Women's Poetry. Ed. Karen McCarthy (The Women's Press)
 2000: IC3: The Penguin Anthology of New Black Writing. Eds Courttia Newland and Kadija Sesay (Penguin)
 2004: KIN: Commemorative Tour Anthology (Renaissance One)
 2004: The Way We See It, The Way It Is (Lynk Reach)
 2007: Breadfruit (flipped eye publishing). 
 2010: Ten New Poets (Bloodaxe)
 2012: Hidden Gems Volume Two: Contemporary Black British Plays. Ed. Deirdre Osborne (Oberon Books). 
 2013: Pepper Seed (Peepal Tree Press) 
 2017: Penguin Modern Poets 3: Your Family, Your Body by Malika Booker, Sharon Olds, Warsan Shire (Penguin). 
 2019: New Daughters of Africa: An international anthology of writing by women of African descent. Ed. Margaret Busby (London:Myriad Editions).

References

External links
 Official website
 "Forward Arts Foundation in conversation with Malika Booker"

21st-century British poets
Black British women writers
21st-century British women writers
English people of Guyanese descent
English people of Grenadian descent
British spoken word artists
1970 births
Living people